Angel Band may refer to:

 "Angel Band" (song), a 19th-century song
 Angel Band (album), a 1987 album by Emmylou Harris

See also 
 Angel (disambiguation) § Groups
 Band of Angels (disambiguation)